"All Due Respect" is the 65th episode of the HBO original series The Sopranos and the finale of the show's fifth season. Written by David Chase, Robin Green, and Mitchell Burgess, and directed by John Patterson, it originally aired on June 6, 2004.

Starring
 James Gandolfini as Tony Soprano
 Lorraine Bracco as Dr. Jennifer Melfi 
 Edie Falco as Carmela Soprano
 Michael Imperioli as Christopher Moltisanti
 Dominic Chianese as Corrado Soprano, Jr. 
 Steven Van Zandt as Silvio Dante
 Tony Sirico as Paulie Gualtieri
 Robert Iler as Anthony Soprano, Jr. 
 Jamie-Lynn DiScala as Meadow Soprano
 Drea de Matteo as Adriana La Cerva **
 Aida Turturro as Janice Soprano Baccalieri *
 Steven R. Schirripa as Bobby Baccalieri
 Vincent Curatola as Johnny Sack
 and Steve Buscemi as Tony Blundetto 
* = credit only
** = picture only

Guest starring
 Jerry Adler as Hesh Rabkin

Also guest starring

Synopsis
A.J. plans a party with a friend, and they end up making $300 profit each. Carmela tells Tony that A.J. asked his guidance counselor which colleges would be suitable for studying event planning. They find some solace in the fact that A.J. is at least "fired up about something."

Christopher disposes of Adriana's last remaining possessions. Carmela phones looking for her, and Chris says that they broke up and she left town. Tony asks him whether he said anything to Adriana about Matthew Bevilaqua or Ralphie Cifaretto that she could have repeated to the FBI. Chris says he did not and assures Tony that he is staying sober and exercising.

Phil reclaims his brother Billy's body from the morgue, and demands that Johnny retaliate against the New Jersey mob. Ray Curto, who continues to provide information to the FBI, not knowing that Adriana has been killed for being an informant, has a birthday dinner. Those present are restive at Tony's continued protection of his cousin, Tony B. With Phil seeking revenge, they are all in danger. Tony delivers a speech: he explains that he is saving Tony B from torture; he would do the same for them; they must unite as a family.

Phil tries to track down Chris as an alternative target of his revenge, noting his closeness to Tony. He threatens Chris's mother. Chris then goes into hiding with the help of Benny, but Phil finds Benny and beats him up, fracturing his skull. Tony goes to Junior for advice, but he cannot help, distracted by dementia. At a consultation, Dr. Melfi reminds Tony that his concern for Tony B comes primarily from his feelings of guilt. Silvio tells Tony of the growing discontent in the family and asserts he is shielding Tony B out of pride, which Tony angrily rejects.

Tony visits Paulie, having heard he is among those dissatisfied with his leadership. In Paulie's living room, he discovers the portrait of himself with his horse Pie-O-My, which he had wanted to be destroyed after the horse's death. Unbeknownst to him, Paulie had kept the painting and had it altered, changing Tony's clothes to those of a colonial general. When Tony demands to know why he had him painted as a "lawn jockey," Paulie says that he did it out of sincere admiration for Tony as a leader. Tony pauses, but then rips the painting off the wall and puts it in a dumpster.

Tony B is hiding out at Uncle Pat's vacated Kinderhook, New York farmhouse. He is returning with some shopping; Tony appears around a corner with a pump-action shotgun and kills him. Tony then tells Phil and Johnny where Tony B can be found. Phil arrives expecting to exact his revenge, but only finds the body. Johnny tells Tony that Tony B's death "didn't solve a thing."

Tony meets Johnny at his New Jersey house and offers a percentage of Tony B's Bloomfield Avenue casino as a peace offering to Phil. At the moment the feud is settled, Tony looks over Johnny's shoulder and sees armed men approaching. They both run away. It is the FBI, who arrest Johnny. Tony throws his handgun into the snow and navigates the neighborhood to avoid the Feds. A few hours later, he calls his lawyer, Neil Mink, who informs him that Johnny was betrayed by Jimmy Petrille, his consigliere. Tony was not mentioned in the indictment. Tony arrives home disheveled; Carmela exclaims, "What happened to you? Your shoes are soaking wet!"

Deceased
 Tony Blundetto:  Shot and killed by Tony Soprano in order to make peace with the Lupertazzi crime family and to save Tony B from a more painful death at the hands of Phil Leotardo.

Title reference
 Vito prefaces his criticism with "All due respect" when discussing the family's problems with New York with the other captains.
 Silvio does the same before criticizing Tony for having too much pride. The phrase is generally used before someone of equal or higher status is told something they don't want to hear. When answering Silvio, Tony repeats the phrase with ironic politeness.
 It could describe: Tony's striving to gain Johnny's respect; Johnny's striving to gain Tony's respect, and Tony's striving to keep the respect of his family.

Production
 This is the final episode directed by John Patterson, who died in 2005. Patterson directed all the season finales for the first five seasons.
 At the end of the episode, Tony's emergence from the rustling bushes reaffirms the use of the bear as a symbol of Tony's dominating presence in his house. Based on the emerging location of the bear in earlier episodes, there is uncertainty as to the identity of the rustling figure.
 Bob Shaw, the production designer for the show, makes a cameo appearance as Ignatz Pravalkis, the architect working with Hugh De Angelis to create Carmela's spec house.
 Drea de Matteo reveals in the DVD commentary for the previous episode, "Long Term Parking," that the character of Tony Blundetto was not initially supposed to die in the fifth-season finale.
 The scene in which Johnny Sack is arrested is shown again in the sixth-season episode "Soprano Home Movies," but a different take is used.

References to previous episodes
 Carmela tells Tony that Adriana was behaving oddly at one of the ladies' "movie nights," which took place in "Rat Pack."
 The painting of Tony and Pie-O-My was destined to be destroyed by Tony but then salvaged by Paulie in "The Strong, Silent Type."
 Tony mentions the Matthew Bevilaqua and Ralph Cifaretto murders, which occurred in "From Where to Eternity" and "Whoever Did This" respectively.

Other cultural references
 Carmela mentions she wants A.J. to fill out an application to East Stroudsburg State University.
 Tony watches a documentary about Erwin Rommel's campaign in World War II on the History Channel.
 Silvio calls the disguised Christopher Claude Rains, as he resembles the title character of The Invisible Man.
 Despite the episode airing in 2004, there is an exterior shot of the Bada Bing which advertises the Holyfield vs. Lewis rematch which took place in November 1999.
 Carmela tells Tony that A.J. watches the DVD of 54, “over and over again.” In the movie, Mike Myers portrays Steve Rubell, a co-founder of New York City’s Studio 54 nightclub famously quoted as saying that only the Mafia made more money than the club brought in.

Music
 The song played over the end credits is "Glad Tidings" by Van Morrison. It is also played earlier when Christopher talks to Silvio at a Roy Rogers, and later during a scene where Tony B arrives at Uncle Pat's farm, shortly before his murder. A The Star-Ledger review of this episode explains the song's importance to the plot: "The episode's use of Van Morrison's "Glad Tidings" as a recurring motif was a classic example of the show's attention to detail. Moments before buckshot hits Blundetto, we heard the verse that opened with "And we'll send you glad tidings from New York" and closed with "Hope that you will come in right on time."
 In the scene wherein Tony is sitting on the steps of an elementary school, "Mr. Tambourine Man" is heard being sung by a children's choir.
 "Smoke N' Mirrors" by Grade 8 plays when Benny tries to leave after he saw Phil walk into the Crazy Horse.

References

External links
"All Due Respect"  at HBO

The Sopranos (season 5) episodes
2004 American television episodes
Television episodes written by David Chase
Television episodes directed by John Patterson (director)